The 2002 Speedway World Cup Event 3 was the third race of the 2002 Speedway World Cup season. It took place on August 6, 2002 in the Arlington Stadium in Eastbourne, Great Britain.

Results

Heat details

References

See also 
 2002 Speedway World Cup
 motorcycle speedway

E3
Speedway
2002 in British motorsport